Boqeh-ye Do (also Romanized as Boq‘eh-ye Do) is a village in Soltanabad Rural District, in the Central District of Ramhormoz County, Khuzestan Province, Iran. At the 2006 census, its population was 146, in 24 families.

References 

Populated places in Ramhormoz County